The Provision and Use of Work Equipment Regulations, commonly abbreviated to PUWER 1998 or simply PUWER, is a statutory instrument of the United Kingdom (1998 No. 2306). It regulates the standards of safety for equipment used in work environments. Its obligations apply to both employers and employees, as well as those who provide equipment for others to use at work. 

PUWER was established under delegated powers enshrined in the Health and Safety at Work etc. Act 1974. The Health and Safety Executive (HSE) is the statutory body in charge of enforcing PUWER.

Background
The PUWER 1998 legislation replaced the 1992 regulations and seeks to address, control and prevent workers risk of injury and death from equipment they use during the course of their jobs. In addition to the requirements laid out in the PUWER legislation, some types of equipment may be subject to other specific legislation. For example, equipment used for lifting (such as fork lifts) are also subject to the requirements of the Lifting Operations and Lifting Equipment Regulations 1998, pressure equipment must meet the Pressure Systems Safety Regulations, and Personal Protective Equipment must meet the PPE Regulations.

The regulations apply to any employer or self-employed worker who uses equipment at work but not equipment used by the public which comes under the Health and Safety at Work Act 1974.

PUWER covers all work equipment from office furniture through to complex machinery and company cars and is also applicable if a company allows a worker to use their own equipment in the work place. All new machinery should carry a CE mark , UKCA marking from its manufacturer to prove its compliance with safety laws. When a CE mark is not relevant then responsibility of the equipment’s safety and up keeping can fall to the organisation.

Requirements of PUWER
The main requirements of PUWER for organisations are to ensure that the equipment used is suitable for its purpose, maintained to be safe and not risk health and safety and inspected at suitable intervals by a competent worker, who should record the results.

External links
Simple guide to the Provision and Use of Work Equipment Regulations 1998
The Provision and Use of Work Equipment Regulations 1998

References

United Kingdom labour law
1998 in law
1998 in the United Kingdom
1998 in labor relations
Statutory Instruments of the United Kingdom